Bar'am may refer to: 

A kibbutz in Northern Israel called Bar'am
A village, now in a National Park, in Northern Israel, where remnants of two synagogues from Talmudic times were found. Called Kfar Bar'am, and also called Kafar Bir'im or Berem
A section of the city of Jerusalem. Called Kfar Bar'am
Kafr Bir'im, a Christian Arab village in Northern Israel, depopulated in 1948